The 2020 Rio Open presented by Claro was a professional men's tennis tournament played on outdoor clay courts. It was the seventh edition of the Rio Open, and part of the ATP Tour 500 series on the 2020 ATP Tour. It took place in Rio de Janeiro, Brazil between 17 and 23 February 2020.

Singles main-draw entrants

Seeds 

 1 Rankings as of February 10, 2020.

Other entrants 
The following players received wildcards into the singles main draw:
  Carlos Alcaraz
  Felipe Meligeni Alves 
  Thiago Seyboth Wild

The following player received entry as a special exempt:
  Pedro Sousa

The following players received entry from the qualifying draw:
  Federico Coria 
  João Domingues
  Gianluca Mager
  Pedro Martínez

The following players received entry as a lucky loser:
  Attila Balázs
  Federico Gaio

Withdrawals 
Before the tournament
  Matteo Berrettini → replaced by  Leonardo Mayer
  Laslo Đere → replaced by  Attila Balázs
  Alexandr Dolgopolov → replaced by  Thiago Monteiro
  Nicolás Jarry (suspension) → replaced by  Jaume Munar
  Diego Schwartzman → replaced by  Andrej Martin
  Pedro Sousa → replaced by  Federico Gaio

Doubles main-draw entrants

Seeds 

 1 Rankings as of February 10, 2020.

Other entrants 
The following pairs received wildcards into the doubles main draw:
  Orlando Luz /  Rafael Matos
  Felipe Meligeni Alves /  Thiago Monteiro

The following pair received entry from the qualifying draw:
  Salvatore Caruso /  Federico Gaio

The following pair received entry as lucky losers:
  Attila Balázs /  Fernando Romboli

Withdrawals 
Before the tournament
  Fernando Verdasco

Champions

Singles 

  Cristian Garín def.  Gianluca Mager, 7–6(7–3), 7–5

Doubles 

  Marcel Granollers /  Horacio Zeballos def.  Salvatore Caruso /  Federico Gaio, 6–4, 5–7, [10–7]

References

External links 
 Official website

2020
Rio Open
Rio Open
Rio Open